is a Japanese kickboxer who competes in the lightweight division. After beginning his career as a featherweight in 2002, Yamamoto became a mainstay in the All Japan Kickboxing Federation and first challenged for the AJKF Featherweight Championship in December 2004 when he fought to a draw with Genki Yamamoto. He then went on a hot streak in 2005, winning the IKUSA 2005 –60 kg Grand Prix in the process, and was given another chance at the AJKF Featherweight title in January 2006 when he beat Genki Yamamoto in a rematch to take the belt. The following years saw Yamamoto move up to lightweight and have more domestic success as he took the AJKF's Best of 60 kg Tournament 2007 and the Krush Lightweight Grand Prix 2009 before he emerged internationally with the It's Showtime promotion. He lost to Sergio Wielzen in his first attempt at the It's Showtime 61MAX Championship in December 2010 but came back to win the belt in July 2012 by defeating Javier Hernandez.

Career

Early career
Yamamoto began practicing Kyokushin karate as a schoolboy and won the all-Japan junior high school full contact karate championships in 2000, followed by the high school championships the following year. He would later begin kickboxing under the legendary Toshio Fujiwara at the Fujiwara Gym in Tokyo, and debuted professionally with a unanimous decision win over Hideki Shimizu at AJKF: Golden Trigger on September 6, 2002.

After amassing an undefeated record of 7-0-2 fighting in the All Japan Kickboxing Federation, Yamamoto was invited to compete in the promotion's Strongest Lightweight Tournament 2004. Having defeated Hiromasa Masuda by unanimous decision at the tournament's opening round on March 13, 2004, he then tasted defeat for the first time at the hands of the eventual tournament winner, Tsogto Amara, when he lost a majority decision in the quarter-finals on April 16, 2004.

He rebounded with three straight victories to earn himself a shot at the AJKF Featherweight (-57 kg/126 lb) Championship against Genki Yamamoto at the Fujiwara Festival 2004 on December 5, 2004. After five rounds of fighting, the bout was called a draw, meaning Genki kept the title.

Domestic dominance
2005 saw Yamamoto wear gold for the first time in his career by winning the IKUSA 2005 –60 kg/132 lb Grand Prix. A first round knockout of Koishiwara at the quarter-final stage on June 18, 2005 was followed up by a points victory over Tomohiro Oikawa in the semis and then a technical knockout win against Naoki Ishikawa in the final on the same night three months later as Yamamoto claimed the crown. This led him to a rematch with Genki Yamamoto for the AJKF Featherweight title on January 4, 2006 at the New Year Kick Festival 2006, where he won a majority decision and became the new Japanese champion.

Yamamoto then went through a rough patch, however, as he went 2-3-1 in his next six fights with all three losses against Thai opposition. At the end of 2007, he was given the chance to get back on track by entering the AJKF's Best of 60 kg Tournament 2007. A second-round knockout of Susumu Daiguji on August 25, 2007 sent him into the semi-finals two months later where he took a unanimous points victory over Naoki Ishikawa, in what was the third fight between the pair. Later that night, Yamamoto defeated Haruaki Otsuki by the same margin in a five-round affair to emerge as Japan's top kickboxer at 60 kg/132 lb.

On January 4, 2008, he made the first and only defence of his AJKF Featherweight strap by knocking Yosuke Mizuochi out with a high kick in round four at the New Year Kick Festival 2008. After being stopped by Muay Thai exponents PKP Rachanon F16 and Wanrop Weerasakreck in his next two outings, he then returned to winning ways with four consecutive victories which earned him a call up to fight on kickboxing's biggest stage, K-1. Making his promotional debut at the K-1 World MAX 2009 World Championship Tournament Final 16 in Fukuoka, Japan, on April 21, 2009, Yamamoto outpointed Yuki to a unanimous judges' decision after flooring his opponent with a knee strike in the third and final round.

Despite a knockout loss to Yuji Takeuchi in his next fight at Krush.3 less than a month later, he was asked to fight in the Krush Lightweight Grand Prix 2009. The tournament kicked off with the first round and quarter-finals on July 24, 2009 and Yamamoto defeated both Junpei Aotsu and Haruaki Otsuki by decision to advance to the final stage on November 2. He met Genki Yamamoto for the third time in the semis and an extension round was needed to separate them, after which Masahiro was given the nod to advance to the final where he went up against Yuta Kubo. Yamamoto sent Kubo to the canvas late in the third round of a back-and-forth war to secure the unanimous decision victory and the third tournament title of his career.

Having already established himself as arguably the top kickboxer at 63 kg/138 lb, Yamamoto returned to K-1 as one of the favourites to win the K-1 World MAX 2010 –63 kg Japan Tournament. He was drawn against Tetsuya Yamato in the opening stage of the tournament held at the K-1 World MAX 2010 -63kg Japan Tournament Final 16 in Tokyo on May 2, 2010 and suffered a significant upset when he was beaten via unanimous decision after an extension round by the unfancied Yamato who would go on to win the whole tournament.

International emergence
Even after two losses in a row following a points defeat to Ryuichi Mukaiyama under Muay Thai rules, Yamamoto was still being held in high regard and was recruited by the European It's Showtime promotion to challenge for Sergio Wielzen's It's Showtime 61MAX (-61kg/134lb) Championship. In his international debut and first attempt at a world title, he met Wielzen at Yiannis Evgenikos presents: It’s Showtime Athens on December 11, 2010 in Athens, Greece. Yamamoto was floored by a knee to the body in round one and was stopped from continuing on the doctor's orders in round three due to cut above his right eye, losing by TKO.

Yamamoto then returned to Japan and racked up a record of 4-0-1 throughout 2011 and early 2012 to earn himself another shot at the It's Showtime 61MAX belt, which was now around the waist of Javier Hernandez. The run included decision wins over Arito Tsukahara, Kan Itabashi and Genki Kanazawa under the It's Showtime Japan banner. Hernandez and Yamamoto faced off at Street Culture, Federación Canaria de Kickboxing & Fightclub Group present: It's Showtime 59 in Tenerife, Spain, on July 21, 2012, and Yamamoto become the new world champion by unanimous decision after using good boxing and knees to outpoint the Spaniard.

He was expected to fight on an It's Showtime card in Yokohama, Japan, on November 17, 2012 but the event was cancelled following the promotion's acquisition by Glory.

He was ranked at #2 behind Masaaki Noiri when the lightweight world rankings were first published by LiverKick in September 2012, but he slipped down to #3 come November as Karim Bennoui nipped in front of him.

On December 2, 2012. Yamamoto faced Dutch import Mansour Yaqubi at RISE/M-1 ~Infinity~ in Tokyo, Japan. Despite being floored by Yaqubi at the beginning of the third round, he was able score three knockdowns for himself before the final bell, forcing a referee stoppage.

He defeated his third international opponent on the bounce when he took an extension round unanimous decision over Karim Bennoui at RISE 92 on March 17, 2013 in Tokyo.

Yamamoto got his revenge over Sergio Wielzen at RISE 94 in Tokyo on July 20, 2013, knocking the Surinamese fighter out with a second round high kick. With this win, he defeated the three other It's Showtime 61MAX Champions.

He participated in La 20ème Nuit des Champions -62 kg/136 lb tournament featuring four of the world's best lightweights in Marseille, France, on November 23, 2013, losing to Yetkin Özkul on points in the semi-finals to exit the competition.

Championships and awards

Kickboxing
All Japan Kickboxing Federation
AJKF Featherweight (-57 kg/126 lb) Championship
AJKF The Best of 60 kg/132 lb Tournament 2007 Champion
IKUSA
IKUSA 2005 –60 kg/132 lb Grand Prix Champion
It's Showtime
It's Showtime 61MAX (-61kg/134lb) Championship
Krush
Krush Lightweight (-63 kg/138 lb) Grand Prix 2009 Champion
Awards
eFight.jp
Fighter of the Month (July 2012)

Kickboxing record 

|- style="background:#fbb;"
| 2020-11-03|| Loss ||align=left| Satoru Nariai||  K-1 World GP 2020 in Fukuoka || Fukuoka, Japan ||  Decision (Unanimous) ||3  ||3:00||
|-
|-  bgcolor="#FFBBBB"
| 2018-11-21|| Loss ||align=left| Yuzuki Satomi ||Krush 95|| Japan || KO (Left Cross) || 2 || 1:59 ||
|-
|-  bgcolor="#FFBBBB"
| 2018-08-18|| Loss ||align=left| Tatsuya Oiwa ||Krush 92|| Japan || TKO (Referee Stoppage) || 2 || 2:58 || 
|-
|-  bgcolor="#FFBBBB"
| 2018-05-26|| Loss ||align=left| Yun Qi ||Glory of Heroes 31: Beijing|| Beijing, China || Decision (unanimous) || 3 || 3:00 || 
|-
|-  bgcolor="#FFBBBB"
| 2017-09-18|| Loss ||align=left| Hirotaka Urabe ||K-1 World GP 2016 -67.5kg World Tournament, Superfight|| Tokyo, Japan || TKO (3 Knockdowns/Straight Right) || 2 || 2:50 ||
|-  bgcolor="#FFBBBB"
| 2017-02-18|| Loss ||align=left| Riku Anpo || Krush.73 || Japan || KO (Punches) || 1 || 2:05||
|-  bgcolor="#CCFFCC"
| 2016-12-18|| Win ||align=left| Go Kato || Krush.71 || Japan || Decision (Unanimous) || 3 || 3:00||
|-  bgcolor="#FFBBBB"
| 2016-04-24 || Loss ||align=left| Taiga || K-1 World GP 2016 -60kg Japan Tournament, Quarter Finals || Tokyo, Japan || KO (Flying Knee) || 1 || 1:47 ||
|-  bgcolor="#FFBBBB"
| 2015-12-04|| Loss ||align=left| Toshi || Krush.61 || Japan || KO (Left Hook)|| 1 || 2:15||
|-  bgcolor="#FFBBBB"
| 2015-08-14|| Loss ||align=left| Leona Pettas || Krush.56 || Japan || Decision (Unanimous) || 3 || 3:00||
|-  bgcolor="#CCFFCC"
| 2015-05-04|| Win ||align=left| Shota Kanbe || Krush.54 || Japan || Ext.R TKO (Doctor Stoppage) || 4 || 1:54||
|-  bgcolor="#FFBBBB"
| 2015-01-18 || Loss ||align=left| Koya Urabe || K-1 World GP 2015 -60kg Championship Tournament, Semi Finals || Tokyo, Japan || KO (Low Kick)|| 1 || 2:44 || 
|-
|-  bgcolor="#CCFFCC"
| 2015-01-18 || Win ||align=left| Gagny Baradji || K-1 World GP 2015 -60kg Championship Tournament, Quarter Finals || Tokyo, Japan || Decision (Majority) || 3 || 3:00 ||
|-  bgcolor="#CCFFCC"
| 2014-11-06 || Win||align=left| Junpei Aotsu || Krush.47 || Tokyo, Japan || Decision (Unanimous) || 3 || 3:00 ||
|-  style="background:#FFBBBB;"
| 2014-08-09|| Loss ||align=left| Hirotaka Urabe || Krush.44 || Tokyo, Japan || Decision (Unanimous) || 3 || 3:00
|-  bgcolor="#CCFFCC"
| 2014-04-15 || Win||align=left| Yanis El Hajoui || Krush.40 || Tokyo, Japan || Decision (Majority) || 3 || 3:00 ||
|-  bgcolor="#FFBBBB"
| 2013-11-23 || Loss ||align=left| Yetkin Özkul || La 20ème Nuit des Champions, Semi Finals || Marseilles, France || Decision || 3 || 3:00 || 41-11-6
|-
|-  bgcolor="#CCFFCC"
| 2013-07-20 || Win ||align=left| Sergio Wielzen || RISE 94 || Tokyo, Japan || KO (left high kick) || 2 || 1:36 || 41-10-6
|-
|-  bgcolor="#CCFFCC"
| 2013-03-17 || Win ||align=left| Karim Bennoui || RISE 92 || Tokyo, Japan || Ext.R decision (unanimous) || 4 || 3:00 || 40-10-6
|-
|-  bgcolor="#CCFFCC"
| 2012-12-02 || Win ||align=left| Mansour Yaqubi || RISE/M-1 ~Infinity~ || Tokyo, Japan || TKO (referee stoppage) || 3 || 2:46 || 39-10-6
|-
|-  bgcolor="#CCFFCC"
| 2012-07-21 || Win ||align=left| Javier Hernandez || It's Showtime 59 || Tenerife, Spain || Decision (unanimous) || 5 || 3:00 || 38-10-6
|-
! style=background:white colspan=9 |
|-
|-  bgcolor="#CCFFCC"
| 2012-03-25 || Win ||align=left| Turbo || M-1 Muay Thai Challenge: Sutt Yod Muaythai Vol.1 || Tokyo, Japan || Decision (unanimous) || 3 || 3:00 || 37-10-6
|-
|-  bgcolor="#CCFFCC"
| 2011-12-22 || Win ||align=left| Genki Kanazawa || It's Showtime Japan 6 || Tokyo, Japan || Decision (unanimous) || 3 || 3:00 || 36-10-6
|-
|-  bgcolor="#CCFFCC"
| 2011-10-23 || Win ||align=left| Kan Itabashi || REBELS.9 & It's Showtime Japan 4 || Tokyo, Japan || Decision (unanimous) || 3 || 3:00 || 35-10-6
|-
|-  bgcolor="#CCFFCC"
| 2011-08-28 || Win ||align=left| Arito Tsukahara || It's Showtime Japan 2 || Tokyo, Japan || Decision (majority) || 3 || 3:00 || 34-10-6
|-
|-  style="background:#c5d2ea;"
| 2011-04-24 || Draw ||align=left| Satoshi Nakamura || REBELS.7 || Tokyo, Japan || Decision draw || 5 || 3:00 || 33-10-6
|-
|-  bgcolor="#FFBBBB"
| 2010-12-11 || Loss ||align=left| Sergio Wielzen || Yiannis Evgenikos presents: It’s Showtime Athens || Athens, Greece || TKO (cut) || 3 || 1:45 || 33-10-5
|-
! style=background:white colspan=9 |
|-
|-  bgcolor="#FFBBBB"
| 2010-09-26 || Loss ||align=left| Ryuichi Mukaiyama || WBC Muaythai: The Road to World Champion || Tokyo, Japan || Decision (unanimous) || 5 || 3:00 || 33-9-5
|-
|-  bgcolor="#FFBBBB"
| 2010-05-02 || Loss ||align=left| Tetsuya Yamato || K-1 World MAX 2010 -63kg Japan Tournament Final 16, First Round || Tokyo, Japan || Ext.R decision (unanimous) || 4 || 3:00 || 33-8-5
|-
|-  bgcolor="#CCFFCC"
| 2010-04-07 || Win ||align=left| Kan Itabashi || RISE 63 || Tokyo, Japan || Ext.R decision (unanimous) || 4 || 3:00 || 33-7-5
|-
|-  bgcolor="#CCFFCC"
| 2009-12-11 || Win ||align=left| Yoshinori Nakasuka || Fujiwara Festival 2009 || Tokyo, Japan || Ext.R decision (unanimous) || 4 || 3:00 || 32-7-5
|-
|-  bgcolor="#CCFFCC"
| 2009-11-02 || Win ||align=left| Yuta Kubo || Krush Lightweight Grand Prix 2009 〜Round.2〜, Final || Tokyo, Japan || Decision (unanimous) || 3 || 3:00 || 31-7-5
|-
! style=background:white colspan=9 |
|-
|-  bgcolor="#CCFFCC"
| 2009-11-02 || Win ||align=left| Genki Yamamoto || Krush Lightweight Grand Prix 2009 〜Round.2〜, Semi Finals || Tokyo, Japan || Ext.R decision (unanimous) || 4 || 3:00 || 30-7-5
|-
|-  bgcolor="#CCFFCC"
| 2009-07-24 || Win ||align=left| Haruaki Otsuki || Krush Lightweight Grand Prix 2009 〜Round.1〜, Quarter Finals || Tokyo, Japan || Decision (majority) || 3 || 3:00 || 29-7-5
|-
|-  bgcolor="#CCFFCC"
| 2009-07-24 || Win ||align=left| Junpei Aotsu || Krush Lightweight Grand Prix 2009 〜Round.1〜, First Round || Tokyo, Japan || Decision (unanimous) || 3 || 3:00 || 28-7-5
|-
|-  bgcolor="#FFBBBB"
| 2009-05-17 || Loss ||align=left| Yuji Takeuchi || Krush.3 || Tokyo, Japan || KO (left hook) || 2 || 1:38 || 27-7-5
|-
|-  bgcolor="#CCFFCC"
| 2009-04-21 || Win ||align=left| Yuki || K-1 World MAX 2009 World Championship Tournament Final 16 || Fukuoka, Japan || Decision (unanimous) || 3 || 3:00 || 27-6-5
|-
|-  bgcolor="#CCFFCC"
| 2009-03-14 || Win ||align=left| Kunitaka Fujiwara || Krush.2 || Tokyo, Japan || Decision (unanimous) || 3 || 3:00 || 26-6-5
|-
|-  bgcolor="#CCFFCC"
| 2009-01-04 || Win ||align=left| Petcheak Sor. Suwanpakdee || AJKF: New Year Kick Festival 2009 || Tokyo, Japan || TKO (doctor stoppage) || 2 || 1:58 || 25-6-5
|-
|-  bgcolor="#CCFFCC"
| 2008-11-08 || Win ||align=left| Akira || Krush ~Kickboxing Destruction~ || Tokyo, Japan || KO (left uppercut) || 1 || 2:33 || 24-6-5
|-
|-  bgcolor="#CCFFCC"
| 2008-09-19 || Win ||align=left| Kompayak Weerasakreck || AJKF: Sword Fight 2008 || Tokyo, Japan || Decision (majority) || 5 || 3:00 || 23-6-5
|-
|-  bgcolor="#FFBBBB"
| 2008-06-22 || Loss ||align=left| Wanlop Weerasakreck || AJKF: Blitz || Tokyo, Japan || KO (left elbow) || 2 || 2:14 || 22-6-5
|-
|-  bgcolor="#FFBBBB"
| 2008-03-20 || Loss ||align=left| F-16 Rachanon || AJKF: Kick On! || Tokyo, Japan || TKO (cut) || 4 || 0:19 || 22-5-5
|-
|-  bgcolor="#CCFFCC"
| 2008-01-04 || Win ||align=left| Yosuke Mizuochi || AJKF: New Year Kick Festival 2008 || Tokyo, Japan || KO (left high kick) || 4 || 2:50 || 22-4-5
|-
! style=background:white colspan=9 |
|-
|-  bgcolor="#CCFFCC"
| 2007-10-25 || Win ||align=left| Haruaki Otsuki || AJKF: The Best of 60 kg Tournament 2007 Final, Final || Tokyo, Japan || Decision (unanimous) || 5 || 3:00 || 21-4-5
|-
! style=background:white colspan=9 |
|-
|-  bgcolor="#CCFFCC"
| 2007-10-25 || Win ||align=left| Naoki Ishikawa || AJKF: The Best of 60 kg Tournament 2007 Final, Semi Finals || Tokyo, Japan || Decision (unanimous) || 3 || 3:00 || 20-4-5
|-
|-  bgcolor="#CCFFCC"
| 2007-08-25 || Win ||align=left| Susumu Daiguji || AJKF: The Best of 60 kg Tournament 2007 Opener, Quarter Finals || Tokyo, Japan || KO (left cross) || 2 || 2:33 || 19-4-5
|-
|-  bgcolor="#FFBBBB"
| 2007-06-17 || Loss ||align=left| Weerachai Chuwattana|| || || TKO (referee stoppage) || 4 || 0:53 || 18-4-5
|-
|-  bgcolor="#CCFFCC"
| 2007-05-11 || Win ||align=left| Mongkontorn Ponsongkram|| AJKF: Rearm || Tokyo, Japan || KO (left cross) || 3 || 0:56 || 18-3-5
|-
|-  style="background:#c5d2ea;"
| 2007-03-09 || Draw ||align=left| Arashi Fujihara || AJKF || Tokyo, Japan || decision (majority) || 5 || 3:00 || 17-3-5
|-
|-  bgcolor="#CCFFCC"
| 2006-12-08 || Win ||align=left| Hiroshi Iwakiri || AJKF: Fujiwara Festival 2006 || Tokyo, Japan || Ext.R decision (unanimous) || 4 || 3:00 || 17-3-4
|-
|-  bgcolor="#FFBBBB"
| 2006-06-11 || Loss ||align=left| Daratai Kiatpayattai|| AJKF: Triumph || Tokyo, Japan || Decision (unanimous) || 3 || 3:00 || 16-3-4
|-
|-  bgcolor="#FFBBBB"
| 2006-03-19 || Loss ||align=left| Wanlop Weerasakreck || AJKF: Sword Fight 2006 || Tokyo, Japan || KO (right front kick) || 3 || 2:48 || 16-2-4
|-
|-  bgcolor="#CCFFCC"
| 2006-01-04 || Win ||align=left| Genki Yamamoto || AJKF: New Year Kick Festival 2006 || Tokyo, Japan || Decision (majority) || 5 || 3:00 || 16-1-4
|-
! style=background:white colspan=9 |
|-
|-  bgcolor="#CCFFCC"
| 2005-11-05 || Win ||align=left| Ichiro Otaka || AJKF: Rock'n Roll || Tokyo, Japan || Decision (unanimous) || 3 || 3:00 || 15-1-4
|-
|-  bgcolor="#CCFFCC"
| 2005-09-19 || Win ||align=left| Naoki Ishikawa || IKUSA 2005 –60 kg Grand Prix Final Stage, Final || Tokyo, Japan || TKO (referee stoppage) || 3 || 2:05 || 14-1-4
|-
! style=background:white colspan=9 |
|-
|-  bgcolor="#CCFFCC"
| 2005-09-19 || Win ||align=left| Tomohiro Oikawa || IKUSA 2005 –60 kg Grand Prix Final Stage, Semi Finals || Tokyo, Japan || Decision (unanimous) || 3 || 3:00 || 13-1-4
|-
|-  bgcolor="#CCFFCC"
| 2005-06-18 || Win ||align=left| Koishiwara || IKUSA 2005 –60 kg Grand Prix Opening Stage, Quarter Finals || Tokyo, Japan || KO (left hook) || 1 || 3:00 || 12-1-4
|-
|-  style="background:#c5d2ea;"
| 2005-03-18 || Draw ||align=left| Chinchai Maimuangkon || AJKF: Rush! || Tokyo, Japan || Decision || 5 || 3:00 || 11-1-4
|-
|-  style="background:#c5d2ea;"
| 2004-12-05 || Draw ||align=left| Genki Yamamoto || AJKF: Fujiwara Festival 2004 || Tokyo, Japan || Decision || 5 || 3:00 || 11-1-3
|-
! style=background:white colspan=9 |
|-
|-  bgcolor="#CCFFCC"
| 2004-10-17 || Win ||align=left| Naoki Ishikawa || AJKF: Hard Blow || Tokyo, Japan || Decision (unanimous) || 5 || 3:00 || 11-1-2
|-
|-  bgcolor="#CCFFCC"
| 2004-08-22 || Win ||align=left| Noriyuki Hiratani || AJKF: Lightning || Tokyo, Japan || TKO (cut) || 2 || 0:27 || 10-1-2
|-
|-  bgcolor="#CCFFCC"
| 2004-06-18 || Win ||align=left| Rascal Taka || AJKF: Strongest Lightweight Tournament Final Stage || Tokyo, Japan || Decision (majority) || 3 || 3:00 || 9-1-2
|-
|-  bgcolor="#FFBBBB"
| 2004-04-16 || Loss ||align=left| Tsogto Amara || AJKF: Strongest Lightweight Tournament 2nd Stage, Quarter Finals || Tokyo, Japan || Decision (majority) || 3 || 3:00 || 8-1-2
|-
|-  bgcolor="#CCFFCC"
| 2004-03-13 || Win ||align=left| Hiromasa Masuda || AJKF: Strongest Lightweight Tournament 2004 1st Stage, First Round || Tokyo, Japan || Decision (unanimous) || 3 || 3:00 || 8-0-2
|-
|-  style="background:#c5d2ea;"
| 2003-12-07 || Draw ||align=left| Noriyuki Hiratani || AJKF: Fujiwara Festival 2003 || Tokyo, Japan || Decision(Majority)  || 5 || 3:00 || 7-0-2
|-
|-  bgcolor="#CCFFCC"
| 2003-08-17 || Win ||align=left| Satoruvashicoba || AJKF: Hurricane Blow || Tokyo, Japan || TKO (cut) || 2 || 2:43 || 7-0-1
|-
|-  bgcolor="#CCFFCC"
| 2003-05-23 || Win ||align=left| Kenji Takemura || AJKF: Strongest Lightweight Tournament 2003 Final || Tokyo, Japan || Decision (unanimous) || 3 || 3:00 || 6-0-1
|-
|-  bgcolor="#CCFFCC"
| 2003-03-08 || Win ||align=left| Akira Iwasa || AJKF: Strongest Lightweight Tournament 2003 1st Stage || Tokyo, Japan || Decision (unanimous) || 3 || 3:00 || 5-0-1
|-
|-  bgcolor="#CCFFCC"
| 2003-02-07 || Win ||align=left| Atsushi Kumagai || AJKF: Red Zone || Tokyo, Japan || TKO (referee stoppage) || 2 || 1:10 || 4-0-1
|-
|-  bgcolor="#CCFFCC"
| 2003-01-04 || Win ||align=left| Tsuyoshi Kurihara || AJKF: Kick Energy || Tokyo, Japan || Decision (unanimous) || 3 || 3:00 || 3-0-1
|-
|-  style="background:#c5d2ea;"
| 2002-11-17 || Draw ||align=left| Yoshikazu Murayama || AJKF: Back From Hell I || Tokyo, Japan || Majority draw || 3 || 3:00 || 2-0-1
|-
|-  bgcolor="#CCFFCC"
| 2002-10-17 || Win ||align=left| Takashi Mikajiri || AJKF: Brandnew Fight || Tokyo, Japan || Decision (unanimous) || 3 || 3:00 || 2-0
|-
|-  bgcolor="#CCFFCC"
| 2002-09-06 || Win ||align=left| Hideki Shimizu || AJKF: Golden Trigger || Tokyo, Japan || Decision (unanimous) || 3 || 3:00 || 1-0
|-
|-
| colspan=9 | Legend:

References

1983 births
Living people
Japanese male kickboxers
Featherweight kickboxers
Lightweight kickboxers
Japanese male karateka
Kyokushin kaikan practitioners
Japanese practitioners of Brazilian jiu-jitsu
People from Nagasaki